S. N. Ramasamy Nadar is an Indian politician and former Member of the Legislative Assembly. He was elected to the Tamil Nadu legislative assembly as a Gandhi Kamaraj National Congress candidate from Sathankulam constituency in 1980 and 1984 elections. He is very Kind and M.G.R's lovable friend. His grave is located at Tiruchendur-Kurumbur Highway Road.

References 

Tamil Nadu politicians
Living people
Year of birth missing (living people)

Tamil Nadu MLAs 1985–1989